The 2018 Rally Australia (formally known as the 27. Kennards Hire Rally Australia) was a motor racing event for rally cars that took place between 15 and 18 November. The event was open to entries competing in World Rally Cars and cars complying with Group R regulations. It marked the twenty-seventh running of Rally Australia and was the final round of the 2018 FIA World Rally Championship and its support series, the WRC-2 and WRC-3 championships. The 2018 event was based in Coffs Harbour in New South Wales and consisted of twenty-four special stages.

Thierry Neuville and Nicolas Gilsoul were the defending rally winners. The Finnish crew of Kalle Rovanperä and Jonne Halttunen are the reigning winners of the World Rally Championship-2, but did not enter the rally this year. There were no defending crews in the World Rally Championship-3 category since no crews entered here last year.

Jari-Matti Latvala and Miikka Anttila won their first rally victory since 2017 Rally Sweden. Their team, Toyota Gazoo Racing WRT, were the manufacturers' winners. The M-Sport Ford WRT crew of Alberto Heller and José Diaz won the World Rally Championship-2 category in a Škoda Fabia R5. In the World Rally Championship-3, there were no classified finishers.

Defending world champions Sébastien Ogier and Julien Ingrassia took fifth place, which was enough for them to secure their sixth consecutive drivers' and co-drivers' titles respectively. Following a win and a 4th-place finish, Toyota Gazoo Racing WRT won their first manufacturers' title since 1999. In the WRC-3 championships, Enrico Brazzoli and Luca Beltrame still secured the titles although the Italian crews retired from the event.

Background

Championship standings prior to the event
Defending world champions Sébastien Ogier and Julien Ingrassia entered the round with a three-point lead over the defending rally winners Thierry Neuville and Nicolas Gilsoul. Ott Tänak and Martin Järveoja were third, a further twenty points behind. In the World Rally Championship for Manufacturers, Toyota Gazoo Racing WRT held a twelve-point lead over Hyundai Shell Mobis WRT.

In the World Rally Championship-2 standings, newly-crowned champions Jan Kopecký and Pavel Dresler lead the drivers' and co-drivers' standings by thirty-three points. Pontus Tidemand and Jonas Andersson were in second, while the Finnish crew of Kalle Rovanperä and Jonne Halttunen were another twenty-one points behind in third. However, all of them did not participate in the event. In the teams' championship, Škoda Motorsport II held a seventeen-point lead over sister team Škoda Motorsport.

In the World Rally Championship-3 standings, Enrico Brazzoli and Luca Beltrame held a slender one-point lead over Taisko Lario and Tatu Hämäläinen, while 2018 Junior World Rally champions Emil Bergkvist and Johan Johansson were in third, eleven and seventeen points further behind in the drivers' and co-drivers' standings respectively. In the teams' championship, ACI Team Italia led Castrol Ford Team Turkiye by sixteen points.

Entry list
The following crews were entered into the rally. The entry list consisted of twenty-nine crews, including twelve World Rally Car entries, four entries in the World Rally Championship-2 and two in the World Rally Championship-3.

Report

Leg 1
Coming into Coffs Harbour, Sébastien Ogier was the championship leader. Being first on the road, he had to endured the lack of grip. He ended the day in seventh after title contender Thierry Neuville suffered a rear-left puncture in the second pass of Sherwood, which dropped him down to tenth overall. Another title rival Ott Tänak also had some issue. His Yaris' engine took on water in a river crossing, which tore the front aero from his car and affected its handling. The Estonian eventually finished in fifth overall, 16.9 seconds off the lead.

It was Mads Østberg and Craig Breen made full use of advantages of being late on the road that gave Citroën a 1–2. Jari-Matti Latvala was 1.9 seconds behind Breen in third, followed by Hayden Paddon, another 3.8 seconds behind in fourth. Esapekka Lappi recovered to sixth after of the same watersplash issue as Tänak's. Ford duo Elfyn Evans and Teemu Suninen completed the day in eighth and ninth respectively after giving positions to their defending world champion Ogier. Andreas Mikkelsen was the only major retirement of the leg. The Norwegian parked his i20 with suspected radiator damage after crashing into a ditch.

Leg 2
Because of the puncture on Friday, Thierry Neuville was the first manufacturer car on the road. The Belgian managed to catch two places despite dry roads meant he was effectively high-speed road-sweepers, cleaning the surface of thick gravel to expose a faster line with more grip for those starting later. He eventually ended the leg in eighth, more than 50 seconds behind the title rival Sébastien Ogier, who kept his position in sixth after a trouble free day. Meanwhile, Ott Tänak set some brilliant pace, which elevated him to the top spot, around 20 seconds cleared of his teammate Jari-Matti Latvala. If the rally ends today, Ogier will win his sixth consecutive drivers' title with 212 points, while Tänak will snatch the runner-up spot from Neuville with an advantage of only one point in the championship standings.

Following two Toyotas, Hayden Paddon was in third, just 4.4 seconds off Latvala. Mads Østberg came into the day as the rally leader, but he was struggled with his Citroën C3’s balance in the afternoon loop. The Norwegian completed the day in fourth, just edged Esapekka Lappi by 3.8 seconds. Teammate Craig Breen fared worse — He spun into a bank and damaged his rear suspension, which dropped him down to tenth overall. Seventh-place Elfyn Evans provided a convenient buffer between Ogier and Neuville, with teammate Teemu Suninen finished the leg in ninth.

Leg 3
It turned out the final leg of the season was a total disaster for two title contenders Thierry Neuville and Ott Tänak. Neuville, who led the championship for most of the year, clipped a bank and a tree on SS22 and forced to retire. One stage later, Tänak stopped because of the damage to transmission. Following two title rivals' retirements, Sébastien Ogier successfully won his sixth drivers' title with a fifth-place finish. Toyota's Jari-Matti Latvala won the rally, which helped the team to win their first manufacturers' title for the first time since 1999. Hayden Paddon and Mads Østberg rounded out of the podium, followed by Esapekka Lappi in a third Yaris. Elfyn Evans completed the event in sixth after teammate Ogier, while Craig Breen gained one place from Teemu Suninen, who retired his Fiesta before the final test following an impact in the previous stage. WRC-2 category winner Alberto Heller, local driver Steve Glenney and rally veteran Jourdan Serderidis covered out of the leaderboard.

Classification

Final results

Point scorers

Special stages

Power stage
The Power stage was a 7.16 km stage at the end of the rally. Additional World Championship points were awarded to the five fastest crews.

Penalties
The following crews were given time penalties during the rally.

Retirements
The following crews retired from the event. Under Rally2 regulations, they were eligible to re-enter the event starting from the next leg. Crews that re-entered were given an additional time penalty.

Championship standings after the rally
Bold text indicates 2018 World Champions.

Drivers' championships

Co-drivers' championships

Manufacturers' and teams' championships

References

External links

  
 2018 Rally Australia in e-wrc website
 The official website of the World Rally Championship

Australia
2018
2018 in Australian motorsport
Rally Australia